People:
 Etta Place (c.1878–?), companion of Butch Cassidy and the Sundance Kid 
 Francis Place (1771–1854), English social reformer
 Godfrey Place (1921–1994), British naval officer
 Jacob C. Place (1828–1881), American politician
 Joanna Place (born 1962), COO of the Bank of England
 Martha M. Place (1855?–1899), American murderer
 Mary Kay Place (born 1947), American actress, singer, director, and screenwriter
 Robert M. Place (born 1947), American artist and author
 Ullin Place (1924–2000), British philosopher and psychologist